Chironius scurrulus, commonly known as the smooth machete savane, is a large slender colubrid snake. It is also known as Wagler's sipo.

Geographic range
It is  found in tropical rainforests of the Brazilian Amazon, Southeastern Colombia, northern Bolivia, Ecuador, east of Venezuela, Peru, Trinidad and Tobago, Guyana, Suriname, French Guiana.

Description
The dorsal scales are in only 10 rows.

Habitat and Biology
It feeds on frogs and lizards. They are diurnal. They live in primary and secondary forest habitats, on the ground or small trees, or in shrubs and bushes.

References

 Wagler, J.G. 1824. Serpentum Brasiliensium species novae, ou histoire naturelle des espèces nouvelles de serpens. In: J.B. Spix. Animalia nova sive species novae. pp. 1–75.

scurrulus
Snakes of South America
Reptiles of Bolivia
Reptiles of Brazil
Reptiles of Colombia
Reptiles of Ecuador
Reptiles of French Guiana
Reptiles of Guyana
Reptiles of Peru
Reptiles of Suriname
Reptiles of Trinidad and Tobago
Reptiles of Venezuela
Fauna of the Amazon
Reptiles described in 1824